USS Demeter (ARB-10) was planned as a United States Navy , but was redesignated as one of twelve Aristaeus-class battle damage repair ships built for the United States Navy during World War II. Named for Demeter (the Greek goddess of agriculture), she was the only US Naval vessel to bear the name.

Construction
Laid down as LST-1121 on 25 October 1944, by the Chicago Bridge & Iron Company of Seneca, Illinois; launched 19 January 1945; sponsored by Mrs. W. B. Wynn; placed in partial commission on 31 January 1945, under the command of Lieutenant P. P. Wynn, USNR; sailed down the Mississippi River on her way to Baltimore, where she was decommissioned on 2 March 1945, for conversion to a battle damage repair ship; and commissioned as Demeter (ARB-10) on 3 July 1945.

Service history
Demeter called at San Diego, from 1 to 6 September 1945, and arrived at Pearl Harbor ten days later. She embarked passengers for the United States and sailed 11 October, for the east coast, arriving at Charleston, South Carolina, on 11 November. She arrived at Green Cove Springs, Florida, on 27 November, and was placed in service in reserve on 27 May 1947, to provide services there to the reserve fleet group. Demeter was sold on 3 September 1959.

Resold in 1961, for merchant service and renamed Motonave, the ship was later renamed Demeter (date unknown). She sank on 12 January 1964.

Notes

Citations

Bibliography 

Online resources

External links
 

 

Aristaeus-class repair ships
Aristaeus-class repair ships converted from LST-542-class ships
Ships built in Seneca, Illinois
1945 ships
World War II auxiliary ships of the United States
Maritime incidents in 1964
Atlantic Reserve Fleet, Green Cove Springs Group